During the 2017–18 Deportivo de La Coruña season, the club participated in La Liga and the Copa del Rey. Deportivo was mathematically relegated to the Segunda División following a 2–4 home defeat at the Riazor to Barcelona on 29 April 2018. The club ultimately finished in 18th position in La Liga.

Squad

Transfers 
List of Spanish football transfers summer 2017#Deportivo La Coruña

In

Out

Pre-season and friendlies

|}

Competitions

Overall

Liga

League table

Matches

Copa del Rey

Round of 32

Statistics

Appearances and goals
Last updated on 19 December 2017.

|-
! colspan=14 style=background:#dcdcdc; text-align:center|Goalkeepers

|-
! colspan=14 style=background:#dcdcdc; text-align:center|Defenders

|-
! colspan=14 style=background:#dcdcdc; text-align:center|Midfielders

|-
! colspan=14 style=background:#dcdcdc; text-align:center|Forwards

|-
! colspan=14 style=background:#dcdcdc; text-align:center| Players who have made an appearance or had a squad number this season but have left the club
|-
|}

Cards
Accounts for all competitions. Last updated on 19 December 2017.

Clean sheets
Last updated on 19 December 2017.

References

Deportivo de La Coruña seasons
Deportivo La Coruña